There have been two baronetcies created for persons with the surname Wakeman, one in the Baronetage of England and one in the Baronetage of the United Kingdom.

The Wakeman Baronetcy, of Beckford in the County of Gloucester, was created in the baronetage of England on 15 February 1661 for George Wakeman. However, the patent was never sealed. The title became extinct on Wakeman's death in c. 1690.

The Wakeman Baronetcy, of Perdiswell Hall in the County of Worcester, was created in the baronetage of the United Kingdom on 20 February 1828 for Henry Wakeman, a landowner and member of the Honourable East India Company Civil Service and son of Thomas Wakeman, Mayor of Worcester in 1761. He built Perdiswell Hall in 1788 and married Sarah Offley of Shropshire.

The third baronet sold Perdiswell and in 1892 built Yeaton Peverey House, Bomere Heath, near Shrewsbury, Shropshire. The fourth baronet was a member of the London County Council from 1922 to 1925, high sheriff of Shropshire in 1934 and chairman of the Shropshire County Council from 1943 to 1963. The baronetcy became extinct on the death of the sixth baronet in 2008.

Wakeman baronets, of Beckford (1661)
 Sir George Wakeman, 1st Baronet (died )

Wakeman baronets, of Perdiswell Hall (1828)
 Sir Henry Wakeman, 1st Baronet (1753–1831)
 Sir Offley Penbury Wakeman, 2nd Baronet (1799–1858)
 Sir Offley Wakeman, 3rd Baronet (1850–1929)
 Sir Offley Wakeman, 4th Baronet, CBE (1887–1975)
 Sir (Offley) David Wakeman, 5th Baronet (1922–1991)
 Sir Edward Offley Bertram Wakeman, 6th Baronet (1934–2008)

The baronetcy became extinct on the death of the 6th Baronet.

Notes

References
 Kidd, Charles, Williamson, David (editors). Debrett's Peerage and Baronetage (1990 edition). New York: St Martin's Press, 1990, 
 

Extinct baronetcies in the Baronetage of England
Extinct baronetcies in the Baronetage of the United Kingdom
1661 establishments in England